SEO Amsterdam Economics'' (SEO) is a scientific institute for economic research commissioned by ministries or businesses.

SEO was founded in 1949''' from the Faculty of Economics of the University of Amsterdam. It is an independent institute, affiliated with the university. Until 2005 it was called "Stichting voor Economisch Onderzoek der Universiteit van Amsterdam" (Foundation for Economic Research of the University of Amsterdam).

List of directors 

The following scientists have been managing directors of SEO Economic Research since its foundation in 1949.:

References

External links 

 SEO Amsterdam Economics Official website

Economic research institutes
University of Amsterdam
Research institutes in the Netherlands